Gliese 686 (GJ 686 / HIP 86287 / LHS 452) is a star in the constellation of Hercules, with an apparent magnitude +9.577. Although it is close to the Solar System - at 26.5 light years - it is not the closest known star in its constellation, since Gliese 661 is 20.9 light years away. The closest system to this star is the bright μ Herculis, at 4.5 light years. They are followed by GJ 1230 and Gliese 673, at 7.2 and 7.6 light years respectively.

Gliese 686 is one of the many red dwarfs in the Solar System neighborhood with a spectral type of M1V, and has an effective temperature of about 3600 K. Its brightness in the visible spectrum is equal to 0.82% of that of the Sun, while its total luminosity is equivalent to 2.7% that of the Sun, since a significant amount of the radiation emitted by these stars is infrared invisible light. Considering only this last parameter, Gliese 686 is considerably brighter than other known red dwarfs; thus, it is 6.5 times more luminous than Ross 154 and 15 times more than Proxima Centauri, the closest star to the Solar System.

Gliese 686 has a radius approximately equal to half the solar radius. Its projected rotation speed is 2.5 km / s, its rotation period being equal to or less than 10.3 days. It has a metallic content lower than that of the Sun; various studies estimate its index metallicity between -0.25 and -0.44. It has an approximate mass between 45% and 49% of the solar mass  and is a star with characteristics comparable to that of Lacaille 9352.

Planetary system 

Gliese 686 has one known super-Earth planet detected by radial velocity.

References

Hercules (constellation)
M-type main-sequence stars
0686
086287
Planetary systems with one confirmed planet
J17375330+1835295
0686